Carles Jordana Madero (born ) is an Andorran politician, diplomat and lawyer and former member of the Andorran General Council, for the Democrats for Andorra. He was elected in 2015. Jordana is currently non-resident Ambassador to the United Kingdom of Great Britain and Northern Ireland and the Republic of Ireland.

Education 
In 2003, he received a Master's degree in business law at the Toulouse (I) University Capitole and a postgraduate degree in Andorran Law from the University of Andorra in 2006.

References 

1977 births
Living people